Kalayapuram  is a village in Kollam district in the state of Kerala, India.

Demographics
 India census, Kalayapuram had a population of 19510 with 9351 males and 10159 females.

References

Villages in Kollam district